W Racing Team (WRT) is a Belgian auto racing team founded in 2009 by engineer and former head of Volkswagen Motorsport René Verbist, racing driver Vincent Vosse, and entrepreneur Yves Weerts. Since 2010 the team campaigns Audi R8 LMSs in several international sports car series. In 2010 the team won the Belcar Drivers' and Teams' Championships, while in 2011 they won the Spa 24 Hours. After winning multiple titles in various GT championships, WRT is considered to be one of the best teams worldwide in GT racing. In 2019 WRT added the highly competitive DTM championship to their program running two Audi RS5 Turbo DTMs. In 2021 WRT added a full time LMP2 program, by entering an Oreca 07 in both the FIA World Endurance Championship and European Le Mans Series, and won the LMP2 class of the 2021 24 Hours of Le Mans.

Racing history

2010-2011: Beginning and early success 

Upon the team's founding in late 2009, WRT purchased three Audi R8 LMS race cars as part of being the official Belgian Audi motorsport importer. The trio of cars shared duties in 2010 between the national Belcar Endurance Championship, the French FFSA GT Championship (now GT Tour), and the mid-season Spa 24 Hours. The team had success from the start, finishing on the podium with at least one car in every Belcar race including two wins by Gregory Franchi and Anthony Kumpen and a third victory in a ten-hour endurance race at Circuit Zolder with François Verbist, Bert Longin, and Bill Bailly. Franchi and Kumpen locked up the Drivers' Championship, while WRT secured the Teams' Championship. Franchi also partnered with Stéphane Lémeret to earn two further podium finishes in FFSA GT. In addition to this program, two Volkswagen Scirocco GT24s were purchased for use in the Belgian Touring Car Series where the team were vice-champions in their category.

Following their first year's success, WRT expanded their program for 2011 by adding the FIA GT3 European Championship and Blancpain Endurance Series to the schedule for their Audis. Once again success came early as WRT won the second of two races in the first event of the FIA GT3 Championship with Franchi partnering Enzo Ide. Their GT Tour program under the title of Team Audi France with French drivers David Hallyday and Stéphane Ortelli also earned its first victory for the team at Dijon-Prenois. In July WRT won the Spa 24 Hours in only their second attempt, with Franchi sharing the drive with factory Audi drivers Timo Scheider and Mattias Ekström.

2012-2018: Further expansion with Audi 

WRT announced further expansion of their program in 2012 with accepted entries in the FIA GT World Championship as the representatives of Audi. They went on to finish third in the Teams standings, winning three races on the way. In 2013 WRT won both the Teams' and Drivers' Championship of the newly named FIA GT Series.

In 2014 WRT competed both in the Blancpain Endurance Series and Blancpain Sprint Series, successor of the FIA GT Series. They won both the Teams' and Drivers' Championship in the Blancpain GT Series as well as in the Blancpain Endurance Series. They also won the Teams' Championship in the Blancpain Sprint Series. In July 2014 they added a second win in the Spa 24 Hours with Laurens Vanthoor, René Rast and Markus Winkelhock at the wheel of an Audi R8 LMS. In 2015 they again won both Teams' and Drivers' championships in the Blancpain GT Series. They were also crowned Teams' Champions in the Sprint and Endurance Series. In May 2015 WRT achieved another major success by winning the 24 Hours of Nürburgring with the new version of the Audi R8 LMS (GT3).

In 2016, WRT made their debut in Touring car racing, running pair of Volkswagen Golfs in the TCR International Series under the Leopard Racing badge. Driving for the team were Stefano Comini and Jean-Karl Vernay. WRT also made their debut in the European Le Mans Series running a Ligier JS P2, but only at the 4 Hours of Spa. They won the TCR International Series Drivers' titles in both 2016 and 2017, with Comini and Vernay respectively. In 2018 and 2019 WRT participated in the World Touring Car Cup fielding a pair of Audi RS3 LMSs.

2019-2020: Deutsche Tourenwagen Masters 

In 2018 WRT won the Bathurst 12 hour race with the Audi R8 LMS (GT3), at their first attempt. On 12 October 2018 WRT announced it would run a pair of Audi RS5 Turbo DTMs in the 2019 DTM season as a customer team. They later announced Jonathan Aberdein and Pietro Fittipaldi, grandson of double Formula One World Champion Emerson Fittipaldi, as their two drivers for the season. Although not scoring a single podium, Aberdein was able to impress with several points scoring positions and finished the season in 10th place as the highest ranked rookie. In August 2019 WRT won the 2019 Suzuka 10 Hours, which was the 48th edition of the Summer Endurance Classic at Suzuka.

At the end of 2019, WRT announced an all new line-up for the 2020 DTM season consisting of 2016 Indy Lights champion Ed Jones and FIA Formula 3 driver Fabio Scherer. Later WRT announced they would enter a third car for Ferdinand Habsburg, who had previously been driving for Aston Martin. 
Before the season started Jones pulled out of the championship due to travel complications as a result of the COVID-19 pandemic. He was subsequently replaced by Harrison Newey, who made his debut in the DTM. Habsburg managed to score his and the teams first podium finish as well as a pole position. 
As a result of Audi's exit at the end of the season it was decided that the Class One formula would be dropped and replaced by GT3 machinery. WRT ultimately decided not to enter the DTM in 2021.

2021-2023: LMP2 Program 

After exiting the DTM, WRT announced their intention to enter the LMP2 class in the FIA WEC to prepare for an eventual program in the new LMDh formula. On January 21 the team officially announced it would enter the FIA WEC with an Oreca 07. The drivers will be Robin Frijns, Ferdinand Habsburg and Charles Milesi. WRT later announced that they would also enter an Oreca 07 in the ELMS driven by Robert Kubica. He will be joined by Louis Delétraz and Yifei Ye. The team once again was successful from the offset and won the first two races of the ELMS championship.

Team WRT decided to enter both cars at the 2021 24 Hours of Le Mans. After taking the lead during the first half of the race WRT was on course to score a sensational 1-2 finish on its Le Mans debut. However, at the start of the last lap car #41 driven by Yifei Ye came to a stop due to a technical fault and was unable to make the finish, giving the win to the sister car #31 who crossed the finish line just over 7 tenths in front of the chasing Oreca 07 from Tom Blomqvist.

Adding to their Le Mans victory, Team WRT ended the 2021 season winning both the Drivers' and Teams' titles in the FIA WEC and ELMS. This means the team won all possible titles in their debut LMP2 season. Additionally WRT won five out of six possible titles in the GT World Challenge series with their GT operation, rounding off their most successful season to date. In 2022 WRT will expand to two full season entries in the FIA WEC. WRT also continues to run several Audi R8 LMS in the GT World Challenge Europe and will field a car for MotoGP legend Valentino Rossi in 2022. He will team up with Audi Sport factory drivers Frédéric Vervisch and Nico Müller. In January 2022 WRT won the Dubai 24 Hour for a second time. In the GT World Challenge Europe, the team won the Sprint Cup Teams' title for the ninth time in ten years while WRT drivers Dries Vanthoor and Charles Weerts won the Drivers' title for the third time in a row. This marked the end of an incredibly successful partnership with Audi Sport across SRO championships where the team earned several wins and won multiple titles. From 2023 WRT will field several BMW M4 GT3s. In the FIA WEC, WRT was unable to retain its LMP2 titles despite winning four out of six races due to a bad result at the 24 Hours of Le Mans where points count double.

On January 15 2023 WRT won the Dubai 24 Hour for the third time after having previously won the 2016 and 2022 editions. This marked WRT’s first outing with BMW and immediately resulted in the BMW M4 GT3’s first major 24 hour race victory.

2024-Present: Hypercar with BMW 

While never officially announced WRT had been chosen by Audi to run their LMDh program in the 2023 FIA WEC Hypercar class. However, days before the first rollout of the car Audi decided to stop the program, officially stating it was putting it on hold. As a result WRT started looking to other options to enter the Hypercar class in the WEC series. On 2 August 2022 WRT announced it would terminate their 13 years long partnership in GT racing with Audi Sport. Hours later BMW Motorsport announced that Team WRT would run their factory LMDh program in the FIA WEC. WRT will start extensive testing of the BMW M Hybrid V8 in 2023 before entering the 2024 FIA World Endurance Championship. In addition to the Hypercar program WRT will also switch to BMW machinery for their GT3 efforts. The team confirmed that they would enter several BMW M4 GT3's starting from 2023.

Results & Achievements

Notable Victories 

 Overall Winner - 2011 24 Hours of Spa-Francorchamps
 Overall Winner - 2011 24 Hours of Zolder
 Overall Winner - 2012 24 Hours of Zolder
 Overall Winner - 2013 Baku World Challenge
 Overall Winner - 2014 24 Hours of Spa-Francorchamps
 Overall Winner - 2014 Baku World Challenge
 Overall Winner - 2015 24 Hours of Nürburgring
 Overall Winner - 2015 12 Hours of Sepang
 Overall Winner - 2016 24 Hours of Dubai
 Overall Winner - 2016 FIA GT World Cup
 Overall Winner - 2018 12 Hours of Bathurst
 Overall Winner - 2019 10 Hours of Suzuka
 LMP2 Winner - 2021 24 Hours of Le Mans
 Overall Winner - 2022 24 Hours of Dubai
 Overall Winner - 2023 24 Hours of Dubai
 Overall Winner - 2023 9 Hours of Kyalami

Main Championship titles 

 Blancpain Endurance Series / GT World Challenge Europe Endurance Cup
 Overall Teams’ Champion in 2011, 2012, 2014, 2015 and 2021
 Overall Drivers’ Champion in 2011, 2012 and 2014
FIA GT Series / Blancpain Sprint Series / Blancpain GT Series Sprint Cup / GT World Challenge Europe Sprint Cup
 Overall Teams’ Champion in 2013, 2014, 2015, 2016, 2017, 2018, 2020, 2021 and 2022
 Overall Drivers’ Champion in 2013, 2016, 2017, 2020, 2021 and 2022
Blancpain GT Series / GT World Challenge Europe
 Overall Teams’ Champion in 2014, 2015, 2020 and 2021
 Overall Drivers’ Champion in 2014, 2015 and 2021
Andros Trophy
 Overall Teams’ Champion in 2015-16 and 2016-17
European Le Mans Series
 LMP2 Teams’ Champion in 2021
 LMP2 Drivers’ Champion in 2021
FIA World Endurance Championship
 Endurance Trophy for LMP2 Teams in 2021
 Endurance Trophy for LMP2 Drivers in 2021

24 Hours of Le Mans

FIA World Endurance Championship 

* Season still in progress

European Le Mans Series

Bathurst 12 Hours results

Deutsche Tourenwagen Masters

References

External links
 

Belgian auto racing teams
Auto racing teams established in 2009
2009 establishments in Belgium
FIA GT1 World Championship teams
International GT Open teams
Blancpain Endurance Series teams
British GT Championship teams
Racecar constructors
WeatherTech SportsCar Championship teams
Super GT teams
ADAC GT Masters teams
Deutsche Tourenwagen Masters teams
TCR International Series teams
FIA World Endurance Championship teams
European Le Mans Series teams
Audi in motorsport
BMW in motorsport
24 Hours of Le Mans teams